Upper Freestone is a rural locality in the Southern Downs Region, Queensland, Australia.

Geography 
Mount Dumaresq Conservation Park has two non-contiguous sections. The larger of the two is in the north of the locality extending further north into Gladfield.

Freestone Creek (which rises on the western side of the Great Dividing Range) enters the locality from the east on the boundary between Maryvale and Swanfels and flows through the locality exiting to the west (Freestone). It is part of the Murray-Darling drainage basin.

History 

Freestone Creek (No 2) Provisional School  opened on 19 October 1874. It was renamed Freestone Creek Upper Provisional School circa 1879. In 1885 it became Freestone Creek Upper State School. In 1940 it was renamed Freestone Upper State School. It closed in 1964. The school was on Upper Freestone School Road.

In 1883  of land was reserved for the Upper Freestone cemetery. A cemetery trust was established in 1896. The cemetery closed in 1971. The only surviving part of the cemetery are a group of graves of the O'Dempsey family which have been maintained by the family. The cemetery is a field to the north of McMaster Road. 

Education 
There are no schools in Upper Freestone. The nearest primary schools are Freestone State School in neighbouring Freestone to the west and Yangan State School in Yangan to the south. The nearest secondary school is Warwick State High School in Warwick to the south-west.

References 

Southern Downs Region
Localities in Queensland